Jorge Mario Pedro Vargas Llosa, 1st Marquess of Vargas Llosa (born 28 March 1936), more commonly known as Mario Vargas Llosa, is a Peruvian novelist, journalist, essayist and former politician, who also holds Spanish citizenship. Vargas Llosa is one of Latin America's most significant novelists and essayists, and one of the leading writers of his generation. Some critics consider him to have had a larger international impact and worldwide audience than any other writer of the Latin American Boom. In 2010 he won the Nobel Prize in Literature, "for his cartography of structures of power and his trenchant images of the individual's resistance, revolt, and defeat." He also won the 1967 Rómulo Gallegos Prize, the 1986 Prince of Asturias Award, the 1994 Miguel de Cervantes Prize, the 1995 Jerusalem Prize, the 2012 Carlos Fuentes International Prize, and the 2018 Pablo Neruda Order of Artistic and Cultural Merit.

Vargas Llosa rose to international fame in the 1960s with novels such as The Time of the Hero (La ciudad y los perros, literally The City and the Dogs, 1963/1966), The Green House (La casa verde, 1965/1968), and the monumental Conversation in the Cathedral (Conversación en la catedral, 1969/1975). He writes prolifically across an array of literary genres, including literary criticism and journalism. His novels include comedies, murder mysteries, historical novels, and political thrillers. Several, such as Captain Pantoja and the Special Service (1973/1978) and Aunt Julia and the Scriptwriter (1977/1982), have been adapted as feature films.

Many of Vargas Llosa's works are influenced by the writer's perception of Peruvian society and his own experiences as a native Peruvian. Increasingly, he has expanded his range, and tackled themes that arise from other parts of the world. In his essays, Vargas Llosa has made many criticisms of nationalism in different parts of the world. Another change over the course of his career has been a shift from a style and approach associated with literary modernism, to a sometimes playful postmodernism.

Like many Latin American writers, Vargas Llosa has been politically active throughout his career. While he initially supported the Cuban revolutionary government of Fidel Castro, Vargas Llosa later became disenchanted with its policies, particularly after the imprisonment of Cuban poet Heberto Padilla in 1971, and now identifies as a liberal. He ran for the Peruvian presidency in 1990 with the center-right Frente Democrático coalition, advocating classical liberal reforms, but lost the election to Alberto Fujimori. He is the person who, in 1990, "coined the phrase that circled the globe", declaring on Mexican television, "Mexico is the perfect dictatorship", a statement that became an adage during the following decade.

Vargas Llosa is also one of the 25 leading figures on the Information and Democracy Commission launched by Reporters Without Borders.

Early life and family

Mario Vargas Llosa was born to a middle-class family on 28 March 1936, in the southern Peruvian provincial city of Arequipa. He was the only child of Ernesto Vargas Maldonado and Dora Llosa Ureta (the former a radio operator in an aviation company, the latter the daughter of an old criollo family), who separated a few months before his birth. Shortly after Mario's birth, his father revealed that he was having an affair with a German woman; consequently, Mario has two younger half-brothers: Enrique and Ernesto Vargas.

Vargas Llosa lived with his maternal family in Arequipa until a year after his parents' divorce, when his maternal grandfather was named honorary consul for Peru in Bolivia. With his mother and her family, Vargas Llosa then moved to Cochabamba, Bolivia, where he spent the early years of his childhood. His maternal family, the Llosas, were sustained by his grandfather, who managed a cotton farm. As a child, Vargas Llosa was led to believe that his father had died—his mother and her family did not want to explain that his parents had separated. During the government of Peruvian President José Bustamante y Rivero, Vargas Llosa's maternal grandfather obtained a diplomatic post in the northern Peruvian coastal city of Piura and the entire family returned to Peru. While in Piura, Vargas Llosa attended elementary school at the religious academy Colegio Salesiano. In 1946, at the age of ten, he moved to Lima and met his father for the first time. His parents re-established their relationship and lived in Magdalena del Mar, a middle-class Lima suburb, during his teenage years. While in Lima, he studied at the Colegio La Salle, a Christian middle school, from 1947 to 1949.

When Vargas Llosa was fourteen, his father sent him to the Leoncio Prado Military Academy in Lima. At the age of 16, before his graduation, Vargas Llosa began working as an amateur journalist for local newspapers. He withdrew from the military academy and finished his studies in Piura, where he worked for the local newspaper, La Industria, and witnessed the theatrical performance of his first dramatic work, La huida del Inca.

In 1953, during the government of Manuel A. Odría, Vargas Llosa enrolled in Lima's National University of San Marcos, to study law and literature. He married Julia Urquidi, his maternal uncle's sister-in-law, in 1955 at the age of 19; she was 10 years older. Vargas Llosa began his literary career in earnest in 1957 with the publication of his first short stories, "The Leaders" ("Los jefes") and "The Grandfather" ("El abuelo"), while working for two Peruvian newspapers. Upon his graduation from the National University of San Marcos in 1958, he received a scholarship to study at the Complutense University of Madrid in Spain. In 1960, after his scholarship in Madrid had expired, Vargas Llosa moved to France under the impression that he would receive a scholarship to study there; however, upon arriving in Paris, he learned that his scholarship request was denied. Despite Mario and Julia's unexpected financial status, the couple decided to remain in Paris where he began to write prolifically —even as a ghostwriter. Their marriage lasted only a few more years, ending in divorce in 1964. A year later, Vargas Llosa married his first cousin, Patricia Llosa, with whom he had three children: Álvaro Vargas Llosa (born 1966), a writer and editor; Gonzalo (born 1967), an international civil servant; and Morgana (born 1974), a photographer.

Writing career

Beginning and first major works
Vargas Llosa's first novel, The Time of the Hero (La ciudad y los perros), was published in 1963. The book is set among a community of cadets in a Lima military school, and the plot is based on the author's own experiences at Lima's Leoncio Prado Military Academy. This early piece gained wide public attention and immediate success. Its vitality and adept use of sophisticated literary techniques immediately impressed critics, and it won the Premio de la Crítica Española award. Nevertheless, its sharp criticism of the Peruvian military establishment led to controversy in Peru. Several Peruvian generals attacked the novel, claiming that it was the work of a "degenerate mind" and stating that Vargas Llosa was "paid by Ecuador" to undermine the prestige of the Peruvian Army.

In 1965, Vargas Llosa published his second novel, The Green House (La casa verde), about a brothel called "The Green House" and how its quasi-mythical presence affects the lives of the characters. The main plot follows Bonifacia, a girl who is about to receive the vows of the church, and her transformation into la Selvatica, the best-known prostitute of "The Green House". The novel was immediately acclaimed, confirming Vargas Llosa as an important voice of Latin American narrative. The Green House won the first edition of the Rómulo Gallegos International Novel Prize in 1967, contending with works by veteran Uruguayan writer Juan Carlos Onetti and by Gabriel García Márquez. This novel alone accumulated enough awards to place the author among the leading figures of the Latin American Boom. Some critics still consider The Green House to be Vargas Llosa's finest and most important achievement. Indeed, Latin American literary critic Gerald Martin suggests that The Green House is "one of the greatest novels to have emerged from Latin America".

Vargas Llosa's third novel, Conversation in the Cathedral (Conversación en la catedral), was published in 1969, when he was 33. This ambitious narrative is the story of Santiago Zavala, the son of a government minister, and Ambrosio, his chauffeur. A random meeting at a dog pound leads the pair to a riveting conversation at a nearby bar known as "The Cathedral". During the encounter, Zavala searches for the truth about his father's role in the murder of a notorious Peruvian underworld figure, shedding light on the workings of a dictatorship along the way. Unfortunately for Zavala, his quest results in a dead end with no answers and no sign of a better future. The novel attacks the dictatorial government of Odría by showing how a dictatorship controls and destroys lives. The persistent theme of hopelessness makes Conversation in the Cathedral Vargas Llosa's most bitter novel.

He lectured on Spanish American Literature at King's College London from 1969 to 1970.

1970s and the "discovery of humor"
In 1971, Vargas Llosa published García Márquez: Story of a Deicide (García Márquez: historia de un deicidio), which was his doctoral thesis for the Complutense University of Madrid. Although Vargas Llosa wrote this book-length study about his then friend, the Colombian Nobel laureate writer Gabriel García Márquez, they did not speak to each other again. In 1976, Vargas Llosa punched García Márquez in the face in Mexico City at the Palacio de Bellas Artes, ending the friendship.  Neither writer had publicly stated the underlying reasons for the quarrel. A photograph of García Márquez sporting a black eye was published in 2007, reigniting public interest in the feud. Despite the decades of silence, in 2007, Vargas Llosa agreed to allow part of his book to be used as the introduction to a 40th-anniversary edition of García Márquez's One Hundred Years of Solitude, which was re-released in Spain and throughout Latin America that year. Historia de un Deicidio was also reissued in that year, as part of Vargas Llosa's complete works.

Following the monumental work Conversation in the Cathedral, Vargas Llosa's output shifted away from more serious themes such as politics and problems with society. Latin American literary scholar Raymond L. Williams describes this phase in his writing career as "the discovery of humor". His first attempt at a satirical novel was Captain Pantoja and the Special Service (Pantaleón y las visitadoras), published in 1973. This short, comic novel offers vignettes of dialogues and documents about the Peruvian armed forces and a corps of prostitutes assigned to visit military outposts in remote jungle areas. These plot elements are similar to Vargas Llosa's earlier novel The Green House, but in a different form. Captain Pantoja and the Special Service is, therefore, essentially a parody of both The Green House and the literary approach that novel represents. Vargas Llosa's motivation to write the novel came from actually witnessing prostitutes being hired by the Peruvian Army and brought to serve soldiers in the jungle.

From 1974 to 1987, Vargas Llosa focused on his writing, but also took the time to pursue other endeavors. In 1975, he co-directed an unsuccessful motion-picture adaptation of his novel, Captain Pantoja and the Secret Service. In 1976 he was elected President of PEN International, the worldwide association of writers and oldest human rights organisation, a position he held until 1979. During this time, Vargas Llosa constantly traveled to speak at conferences organized by international institutions such as the Hebrew University of Jerusalem and the University of Cambridge, where he was Simón Bolívar Professor and an Overseas Fellow of Churchill College in 1977–78.

In 1977, Vargas Llosa was elected as a member of the Peruvian Academy of Language, a membership he still holds today. That year, he also published Aunt Julia and the Scriptwriter (La tía Julia y el escribidor), based in part on his marriage to his first wife, Julia Urquidi, to whom he dedicated the novel. She later wrote a memoir, Lo que Varguitas no dijo (What Little Vargas Didn't Say), in which she gives her personal account of their relationship. She states that Vargas Llosa's account exaggerates many negative points in their courtship and marriage while minimizing her role of assisting his literary career. Aunt Julia and the Scriptwriter is considered one of the most striking examples of how the language and imagery of popular culture can be used in literature. The novel was adapted in 1990 into a Hollywood feature film, Tune in Tomorrow.

Later novels

Vargas Llosa's fourth major novel, The War of the End of the World (La guerra del fin del mundo), was published in 1981 and was his first attempt at a historical novel. This work initiated a radical change in Vargas Llosa's style towards themes such as messianism and irrational human behaviour. It recreates the War of Canudos, an incident in 19th-century Brazil in which an armed millenarian cult held off a siege by the national army for months. As in Vargas Llosa's earliest work, this novel carries a sober and serious theme, and its tone is dark. Vargas Llosa's bold exploration of humanity's propensity to idealize violence, and his account of a man-made catastrophe brought on by fanaticism on all sides, earned the novel substantial recognition.
Because of the book's ambition and execution, critics have argued that this is one of Vargas Llosa's greatest literary pieces.
Even though the novel has been acclaimed in Brazil, it was initially poorly received because a foreigner was writing about a Brazilian theme. The book was also criticized as revolutionary and anti-socialist. Vargas Llosa says that this book is his favorite and was his most difficult accomplishment.

After completing The War of the End of the World, Vargas Llosa began to write novels that were significantly shorter than many of his earlier books. In 1983, he finished The Real Life of Alejandro Mayta (Historia de Mayta, 1984). The novel focuses on a leftist insurrection that took place on 29 May 1962, in the Andean city of Jauja. Later the same year, during the Sendero Luminoso uprising, Vargas Llosa was asked by the Peruvian President Fernando Belaúnde Terry to join the Investigatory Commission, a task force to inquire into the massacre of eight journalists at the hands of the villagers of Uchuraccay. The commission's main purpose was to investigate the murders in order to provide information regarding the incident to the public. Following his involvement with the Investigatory Commission, Vargas Llosa published a series of articles to defend his position in the affair. In 1986, he completed his next novel, Who Killed Palomino Molero (¿Quién mató a Palomino Molero?), which he began writing shortly after the end of the Uchuraccay investigation. Though the plot of this mystery novel is similar to the tragic events at Uchuraccay, literary critic Roy Boland points out that it was not an attempt to reconstruct the murders, but rather a "literary exorcism" of Vargas Llosa's own experiences during the commission. The experience also inspired one of Vargas Llosa's later novels, Death in the Andes (Lituma en los Andes), originally published in 1993 in Barcelona.

It was almost 20 years before Vargas Llosa wrote another major work: The Feast of the Goat (La fiesta del chivo), a political thriller, was published in 2000 (and in English in 2001). According to Williams, it is Vargas Llosa's most complete and most ambitious novel since The War of the End of the World. Critic Sabine Koellmann sees it in the line of his earlier novels such as "Conversación en la catedral" depicting the effects of authoritarianism, violence and the abuse of power on the individual. Based on the dictatorship of Rafael Trujillo, who governed the Dominican Republic from 1930 until his assassination in 1961, the novel has three main strands: one concerns Urania Cabral, the daughter of a former politician and Trujillo loyalist, who returns for the first time since leaving the Dominican Republic after Trujillo's assassination 30 years earlier; the second concentrates on the assassination itself, the conspirators who carry it out, and its consequences; and the third and final strand deals with Trujillo himself in scenes from the end of his regime. The book quickly received positive reviews in Spain and Latin America, and has had a significant impact in Latin America, being regarded as one of Vargas Llosa's best works.

In 1995, he wrote and published a children's book called Hitos y Mitos Literarios ("The Milestones and the Stories of Greatest Literary Works"), illustrated by Willi Glasauer. The book includes fun facts, trivia, and information accompanied by photos and Willi Glasauer's illustrations of the likes of Brave New World by Aldous Huxley, The Tin Drum by Günter Grass, Manhattan Transfer by John Dos Passos, Mrs Dalloway by Virginia Woolf, The Stranger by Albert Camus, Lolita by Vladimir Nabokov, One Day in the Life of Ivan Denisovich by Aleksandr Solzhenitsyn, Tropic of Cancer by Henry Miller, Death in Venice by Thomas Mann, The Great Gatsby by F. Scott Fitzgerald, Herzog by Saul Bellow, East of Eden by John Steinbeck, Steppenwolf by Hermann Hesse, and A Moveable Feast by Ernest Hemingway.

In 2003 he wrote The Way to Paradise in which he studies Flora Tristan and Paul Gauguin.

In 2006, Vargas Llosa wrote The Bad Girl (Travesuras de la niña mala), which journalist Kathryn Harrison argues is a rewrite (rather than simply a recycling) of Gustave Flaubert's Madame Bovary (1856). In Vargas Llosa's version, the plot relates the decades-long obsession of its narrator, a Peruvian expatriate in Paris, with a woman with whom he first fell in love when both were teenagers.

In 2019 he published the novel Tiempos recios (Fierce times ), about the 1954 coup in Guatemala.

Political career

Turn to liberalism 

Like many other Latin American intellectuals, Vargas Llosa was initially a supporter of the Cuban revolutionary government of Fidel Castro. He studied Marxism in depth as a university student and was later persuaded by communist ideals after the success of the Cuban Revolution. Gradually, Vargas Llosa came to believe that socialism was incompatible with what he considered to be general liberties and freedoms. The official rupture between the writer and the policies of the Cuban government occurred with the so-called 'Padilla Affair', when the Castro regime imprisoned the poet Heberto Padilla for a month in 1971. Vargas Llosa, along with other intellectuals of the time, wrote to Castro protesting the Cuban political system and its imprisonment of the artist. Vargas Llosa has identified himself with liberalism rather than extreme left-wing political ideologies ever since. Since he relinquished his earlier leftism, he has opposed both left- and right-wing authoritarian regimes.

Investigatory Commission 

Unfortunately for Vargas Llosa, his involvement with the Investigatory Commission led to immediate negative reactions and defamation from the Peruvian press; many suggested that the massacre was a conspiracy to keep the journalists from reporting the presence of government paramilitary forces in Uchuraccay. The commission concluded that it was the indigenous villagers who had been responsible for the killings; for Vargas Llosa the incident showed "how vulnerable democracy is in Latin America and how easily it dies under dictatorships of the right and left". These conclusions, and Vargas Llosa personally, came under intense criticism: anthropologist Enrique Mayer, for instance, accused him of "paternalism", while fellow anthropologist Carlos Iván Degregori criticized him for his ignorance of the Andean world. Vargas Llosa was accused of actively colluding in a government cover-up of army involvement in the massacre. American Latin American literature scholar Misha Kokotovic summarizes that the novelist was charged with seeing "indigenous cultures as a 'primitive' obstacle to the full realization of his Western model of modernity". Shocked both by the atrocity itself and then by the reaction his report had provoked, Vargas Llosa responded that his critics were apparently more concerned with his report than with the hundreds of peasants who later died at the hands of the Sendero Luminoso guerrilla organization.

Presidential candidacy 

In 1987, he helped form and soon became a leader of the center-right party Movimiento Libertad. The following year his party entered a coalition with the parties of Peru's two principal conservative politicians at the time, ex-president Fernando Belaúnde Terry (of the Popular Action party) and Luis Bedoya Reyes (of the Partido Popular Cristiano), to form the tripartite center-right coalition known as Frente Democrático (FREDEMO). He ran for the presidency of Peru in 1990 as the candidate of the FREDEMO coalition with the support of the United States. He proposed neoliberal policies similar to Fujimori that included a drastic economic austerity program that frightened most of the country's poor; this program emphasized the need for privatization, a market economy, free trade, and most importantly, the dissemination of private property. Although he won the first round with 34% of the vote, Vargas Llosa was defeated by a then-unknown agricultural engineer, Alberto Fujimori, in the subsequent run-off. Vargas Llosa included an account of his run for the presidency in the memoir A Fish in the Water (El pez en el agua, 1993). Since his political defeat, he has focused mainly on his writing, with only occasional political involvement.

A month after losing the election, at the invitation of Octavio Paz, Vargas Llosa attended a conference in Mexico entitled, "The 20th Century: The Experience of Freedom". Focused on the collapse of communist rule in central and eastern Europe, it was broadcast on Mexican television from 27 August to 2 September. Addressing the conference on 30 August 1990, Vargas Llosa embarrassed his hosts by condemning the Mexican system of power based on the rule of the Institutional Revolutionary Party (PRI), which had been in power for 61 years. Criticizing the PRI by name, he commented, "I don't believe that there has been in Latin America any case of a system of dictatorship which has so efficiently recruited the intellectual milieu, bribing it with great subtlety." He declared, "Mexico is the perfect dictatorship. The perfect dictatorship is not communism, not the USSR, not Fidel Castro; the perfect dictatorship is Mexico. Because it is a camouflaged dictatorship." The statement, "Mexico is the perfect dictatorship" became a cliché in Mexico and internationally, until the PRI fell from power in 2000.

Later life 
Vargas Llosa has mainly lived in Madrid since the 1990s, but spends roughly three months of the year in Peru with his extended family. He also frequently visits London where he occasionally spends long periods. Vargas Llosa acquired Spanish citizenship in 1993, though he still holds Peruvian nationality. The writer often reiterates his love for both countries. In his Nobel speech he observed: "I carry Peru deep inside me because that is where I was born, grew up, was formed, and lived those experiences of childhood and youth that shaped my personality and forged my calling". He then added: "I love Spain as much as Peru, and my debt to her is as great as my gratitude. If not for Spain, I never would have reached this podium or become a known writer".

Mario Vargas Llosa served as a visiting professor of Latin American studies at Harvard University during the 1992–1993 academic year. Harvard later recognized Vargas Llosa by conferring upon him an honorary Doctor of Letters degree in 1999. In 1994 he was elected a member of the Real Academia Española (Royal Spanish Academy), he took up seat L on 15 January 1996. Vargas Llosa joined the Mont Pelerin Society in 2014. He is also a member of Washington, D.C. based think tank, the Inter-American Dialogue.

Political work

Spain 
He has been involved in the Spain's political arena. In February 2008 he stopped supporting the People's Party in favor of the recently created Union, Progress and Democracy, claiming that certain conservative views held by the former party are at odds with his classical liberal beliefs. His political ideologies appear in the book Política razonable, written with Fernando Savater, Rosa Díez, Álvaro Pombo, Albert Boadella and Carlos Martínez Gorriarán. He continues to write, both journalism and fiction, and to travel extensively. He has also taught as a visiting professor at a number of prominent universities.

Peru 
In April 2011, the writer took part in the 2011 Peruvian general election by saying he was going to vote for Alejandro Toledo (Peruvian former president 2001–2006). After casting his vote, he said his country should stay in the path of legality and freedom.

Vargas Llosa is opposed to Catalan independence from Spain. Attending an anti-independence rally in October 2017, he said: "Spanish democracy is here to stay. No separatist conspiracy can destroy it." In 2021 he attended a rally against the pardon of the Catalan independence leaders in Madrid.

Since her introduction into politics, Vargas Llosa has had a complex opinion on far-right politician Keiko Fujimori, daughter of the authoritarian president of Peru Alberto Fujimori. During her candidacy in the 2011 Peruvian general election, Vargas Llosa said "the worst option is that of Keiko Fujimori because it means the legitimation of one of the worst dictatorships that Peru has had in its history". After Fujimori announced her candidacy for the 2016 Peruvian general election, Vargas Llosa said in 2014 "Keiko is the daughter of a murderer and a thief who is imprisoned, tried by civil courts with international observers, sentenced to 25 years in prison for murder and theft. I do not want her to win the elections". However, in the second round of the 2021 Peruvian general election, Vargas Llosa expressed support for Keiko, sharing opposition to far-left candidate Pedro Castillo and describing Fujimori as the "lesser of two evils".

Chile 
During the 2021 Chilean general elections, Vargas Llosa expressed support for José Antonio Kast, the far-right candidate for president who defended the military dictatorship of Augusto Pinochet.

Brazil 
During the 2022 Brazilian general election, Vargas Llosa expressed his endorsement for far-right leader Jair Bolsonaro, a supporter of Brazilian military dictatorship. "The case of Bolsonaro it's a hard question. His jokes are very hard to endorse, for a liberal [...] Now, between Bolsonaro and Lula, i prefer Bolsonaro. Even with jokes from Bolsonaro, Lula no." said Llosa at a conference.

Panama and Pandora Papers 
Vargas Llosa was named in both the Panama Papers (2016) and Pandora Papers (2021) released by the International Consortium of Investigative Journalists. According to IDL-Reporteros, the British Virgin Islands company Melek Investing Inc. was documented to be owned by Vargas Llosa was used for book royalty profits and the sale of real estate in London and Madrid. Following the Panama Papers leak in 2016, Carmen Balcells said on behalf of Vargas Llosa that investments were made "without the consent of Messrs. Vargas Llosa" while in the 2021 Pandora Papers leaks, Javier Martín, a representative of Vargas Llosa, said the writer "was not aware of the ownership of that company". IDL-Reporteros provided a document showing Vargas Llosa's signature on a "Consent to Act as Director" form for Melek Investing Inc. as part of the 2021 leak.

Style of writing

Plot, setting, and major themes
Vargas Llosa's style encompasses historical material as well as his own personal experiences. For example, in his first novel, The Time of the Hero, his own experiences at the Leoncio Prado military school informed his depiction of the corrupt social institution which mocked the moral standards it was supposed to uphold. Furthermore, the corruption of the book's school is a reflection of the corruption of Peruvian society at the time the novel was written. Vargas Llosa frequently uses his writing to challenge the inadequacies of society, such as demoralization and oppression by those in political power towards those who challenge this power. One of the main themes he has explored in his writing is the individual's struggle for freedom within an oppressive reality. For example, his two-volume novel Conversation in the Cathedral is based on the tyrannical dictatorship of Peruvian President Manuel A. Odría. The protagonist, Santiago, rebels against the suffocating dictatorship by participating in the subversive activities of leftist political groups. In addition to themes such as corruption and oppression, Vargas Llosa's second novel, The Green House, explores "a denunciation of Peru's basic institutions", dealing with issues of abuse and exploitation of the workers in the brothel by corrupt military officers.

Many of Vargas Llosa's earlier novels were set in Peru, while in more recent work he has expanded to other regions of Latin America, such as Brazil and the Dominican Republic. His responsibilities as a writer and lecturer have allowed him to travel frequently and led to settings for his novels in regions outside of Peru. The War of the End of the World was his first major work set outside Peru. Though the plot deals with historical events of the Canudos revolt against the Brazilian government, the novel is not based directly on historical fact; rather, its main inspiration is the non-fiction account of those events published by Brazilian writer Euclides da Cunha in 1902. The Feast of the Goat, based on the dictatorship of Rafael Trujillo, takes place in the Dominican Republic; in preparation for this novel, Vargas Llosa undertook a comprehensive study of Dominican history. The novel was characteristically realist, and Vargas Llosa underscores that he "respected the basic facts, ... I have not exaggerated", but at the same time he points out "It's a novel, not a history book, so I took many, many liberties."

One of Vargas Llosa's more recent novels, The Way to Paradise (El paraíso en la otra esquina), is set largely in Tahiti in France. Based on the biography of former social reformer Flora Tristan, it demonstrates how Flora and Paul Gauguin were unable to find paradise, but were still able to inspire followers to keep working towards a socialist utopia. Unfortunately, Vargas Llosa was not as successful in transforming these historical figures into fiction. Some critics, such as Barbara Mujica, argue that The Way to Paradise lacks the "audacity, energy, political vision, and narrative genius" that was present in his previous works.

Modernism and postmodernism
The works of Mario Vargas Llosa are viewed as both modernist and postmodernist novels. Though there is still much debate over the differences between modernist and postmodernist literature, literary scholar M. Keith Booker claims that the difficulty and technical complexity of Vargas Llosa's early works, such as The Green House and Conversation in the Cathedral, are clearly elements of the modern novel. Furthermore, these earlier novels all carry a certain seriousness of attitude—another important defining aspect of modernist art. By contrast, his later novels such as Captain Pantoja and the Special Service, Aunt Julia and the Scriptwriter, The Real Life of Alejandro Mayta, and The Storyteller (El hablador) appear to follow a postmodernist mode of writing. These novels have a much lighter, farcical, and comic tone, characteristics of postmodernism. Comparing two of Vargas Llosa's novels, The Green House and Captain Pantoja and the Special Service, Booker discusses the contrast between modernism and postmodernism found in the writer's works: while both novels explore the theme of prostitution as well as the workings of the Peruvian military, Booker points out that the former is gravely serious whereas the latter is ridiculously comic.

Interlacing dialogues

Literary scholar M. Keith Booker argues that Vargas Llosa perfects the technique of interlacing dialogues in his novel The Green House. By combining two conversations that occur at different times, he creates the illusion of a flashback. Vargas Llosa also sometimes uses this technique as a means of shifting location by weaving together two concurrent conversations happening in different places. This technique is a staple of his repertoire, which he began using near the end of his first novel, The Time of the Hero. However, he does not use interlacing dialogues in the same way in all of his novels. For example, in The Green House the technique is used in a serious fashion to achieve a sober tone and to focus on the interrelatedness of important events separated in time or space. In contrast, Captain Pantoja and the Special Service employs this strategy for comic effects and uses simpler spatial shifts. This device is similar to both Virginia Woolf's mixing of different characters' soliloquies and Gustave Flaubert's counterpoint technique in which he blends together conversation with other events, such as speeches. This was seen to occur yet again in Vargas Llosa's most current work, "Tiempos Recios," as two dialogues, one between Trujillo and Castillo Armas, and another between Trujillo and Abbes García, are juxtaposed.

Literary influences

Vargas Llosa's first literary influences were relatively obscure Peruvian writers such as Martín Adán, Carlos Oquendo de Amat, and César Moro. As a young writer, he looked to these revolutionary novelists in search of new narrative structures and techniques in order to delineate a more contemporary, multifaceted experience of urban Peru. He was looking for a style different from the traditional descriptions of land and rural life made famous by Peru's foremost novelist at the time, José María Arguedas. Vargas Llosa wrote of Arguedas's work that it was "an example of old-fashioned regionalism that had already exhausted its imaginary possibilities". Although he did not share Arguedas's passion for indigenous reality, Vargas Llosa admired and respected the novelist for his contributions to Peruvian literature. Indeed, he has published a book-length study on his work, La utopía arcaica (1996).

Rather than restrict himself to Peruvian literature, Vargas Llosa also looked abroad for literary inspiration. Two French figures, existentialist Jean-Paul Sartre and novelist Gustave Flaubert, influenced both his technique and style. Sartre's influence is most prevalent in Vargas Llosa's extensive use of conversation. The epigraph of The Time of the Hero, his first novel, is also taken directly from Sartre's work. Flaubert's artistic independence—his novels' disregard of reality and morals—has always been admired by Vargas Llosa, who wrote a book-length study of Flaubert's aesthetics, The Perpetual Orgy. In his analysis of Flaubert, Vargas Llosa questions the revolutionary power of literature in a political setting; this is in contrast to his earlier view that "literature is an act of rebellion", thus marking a transition in Vargas Llosa's aesthetic beliefs. Other critics such as Sabine Köllmann argue that his belief in the transforming power of literature is one of the great continuities that characterize his fictional and non-fictional work, and link his early statement that 'Literature is Fire' with his Nobel Prize Speech 'In Praise of Reading and Writing'.

One of Vargas Llosa's favourite novelists, and arguably the most influential on his writing career, is the American William Faulkner. Vargas Llosa considers Faulkner "the writer who perfected the methods of the modern novel". Both writers' styles include intricate changes in time and narration. In The Time of the Hero, for example, aspects of Vargas Llosa's plot, his main character's development and his use of narrative time are influenced by his favourite Faulkner novel, Light in August.

In addition to the studies of Arguedas and Flaubert, Vargas Llosa has written literary criticisms of other authors that he has admired, such as Gabriel García Márquez, Albert Camus, Ernest Hemingway, and Jean-Paul Sartre. The main goals of his non-fiction works are to acknowledge the influence of these authors on his writing, and to recognize a connection between himself and the other writers; critic Sara Castro-Klarén argues that he offers little systematic analysis of these authors' literary techniques. In The Perpetual Orgy, for example, he discusses the relationship between his own aesthetics and Flaubert's, rather than focusing on Flaubert's alone.

Later personal life 
Starting in 2015, Vargas Llosa was in a relationship with Filipina Spanish socialite and TV personality Isabel Preysler and divorced Patricia Llosa. In December 2022, it was announced Llosa and Preysler had split up.

Llosa is an agnostic, "I was not a believer, nor was I an atheist either, but, rather, an agnostic".

As for hobbies, he is fond of association football and is a supporter of Universitario de Deportes. The writer himself has confessed in his book A Fish in the Water since childhood he has been a fan of the 'cream colored' team from Peru, which was first seen in the field one day in 1946 when he was only 10 years old. In February 2011, Vargas Llosa was awarded an honorary life membership of this football club, in a ceremony which took place in the Monumental Stadium of Lima.

He was infected with COVID-19 and was hospitalized in April 2022.

Impact
Mario Vargas Llosa is considered a major Latin American writer, alongside other authors such as Octavio Paz, Julio Cortázar, Jorge Luis Borges, Gabriel García Márquez, Carlos Fuentes and Isabel Allende. In his book The New Novel in Latin America (La Nueva Novela), Fuentes offers an in-depth literary criticism of the positive influence Vargas Llosa's work has had on Latin American literature. Indeed, for the literary critic Gerald Martin, writing in 1987, Vargas Llosa was "perhaps the most successful ... certainly the most controversial Latin American novelist of the past twenty-five years".

Most of Vargas Llosa's narratives have been translated into multiple languages, marking his international critical success. Vargas Llosa is also noted for his substantial contribution to journalism, an accomplishment characteristic of few other Latin American writers. He is recognized among those who have most consciously promoted literature in general, and more specifically the novel itself, as avenues for meaningful commentary about life. During his career, he has written more than a dozen novels and many other books and stories, and, for decades, he has been a voice for Latin American literature.

A number of Vargas Llosa's works have been adapted for the screen, including The Time of the Hero and Captain Pantoja and the Special Service (both by the Peruvian director Francisco Lombardi) and The Feast of the Goat (by Vargas Llosa's cousin, Luis Llosa). Aunt Julia and the Scriptwriter was turned into the English-language film, Tune in Tomorrow. The Feast of the Goat has also been adapted as a theatrical play by Jorge Alí Triana, a Colombian playwright and director.

Awards and honors

Vargas Llosa has won numerous awards for his writing, from the 1959 Premio Leopoldo Alas and the 1962 Premio Biblioteca Breve to the 1993 Premio Planeta (for Death in the Andes) and the Jerusalem Prize in 1995. The literary critic Harold Bloom has included his novel The War of the End of the World in his list of essential literary works in the Western Canon.

An important distinction he has received is the 1994 Miguel de Cervantes Prize, considered the most important accolade in Spanish-language literature and awarded to authors whose "work has contributed to enrich, in a notable way, the literary patrimony of the Spanish language". In 2002, Vargas was the recipient of the PEN/Nabokov Award. Vargas Llosa also received the 2005 Irving Kristol Award from the American Enterprise Institute and was the 2008 recipient of the Harold and Ethel L. Stellfox Visiting Scholar and Writers Award at Dickinson College.

On 7 October 2010 the Swedish Academy announced that the 2010 Nobel Prize in Literature was awarded to Vargas Llosa "for his cartography of structures of power and his trenchant images of the individual's resistance, revolt, and defeat." The decision to award Vargas Llosa the Nobel Prize in Literature was well received around the world.

On 18 November 2010, Vargas Llosa received the honorary degree Degree of Letters from the City College of New York of the City University of New York, where he also delivered the President's Lecture.

On 4 February 2011, Vargas Llosa was raised into the Spanish nobility by King Juan Carlos I with the hereditary title of Marqués de Vargas Llosa (Marquess of Vargas Llosa).

On 25 November 2021, Vargas Llosa was elected to the Académie Française.

Honours 

 
  Cross of Honour for Science and Art
 
  First Class of the Order of Educational and Cultural Merit Gabriela Mistral
 
 Grand Cross with Silver Star of the Order of Christopher Columbus
 
  Chevalier of the Legion of Honour
 Commander of the Ordre des Arts et des Lettres (1993)
 Officer of the Ordre des Arts et des Lettres 
 
  Commander (Placa) of the Order of the Aztec Eagle

 Grand Cross with Silver Star of the Order of Rubén Darío
 
 Member of the Peruvian Academy of Language
 Grand Cross with Diamonds of the Order of the Sun of Peru
2011 – Grand Cross of the Medal of Honor of the National University of San Marcos, his alma mater.
 
  Gran Cross of the Order of Vasco Núñez de Balboa
 
  Honorary Professor, bestowed by the University of Santo Tomas, Espana, Manila
 
 Hereditary Marquessate of Vargas Llosa, bestowed by King Juan Carlos I of Spain
Member of the Royal Spanish Academy
 Gold Medal of the Community of Madrid

Awards 

Honorable Visitor of Buenos Aires

2018 – Emeritus Professor at Adolfo Ibáñez University
2018 – Pablo Neruda Order of Artistic and Cultural Merit
 
2011 – Honorary Senior Research Fellow from the Institute of Foreign Literature of the Chinese Academy of Social Sciences
2011 – Honorary Senior Research Fellow from the Shanghai International Studies University

2016 – Premio Internacional Pedro Henríquez Ureña from the Ministry of Culture and Presidency of the Republic
 
 1985 – Prix Ritz-Paris-Hemingway for his novel La guerra del fin del mundo

1982 – Istituto italo-latino americano Prize
1989 – Scanno Prize for his novel El hablador
1990 – Castiglione de Sicilia Prize
1986 – Grinzane Cavour Prize for Fiction foreign
2004 – Grinzane Cavour Prize
2010 – International Award Viareggio-Versilia
2010 – International Award Viareggio-Versilia
2014 – Bruno Leoni Award
 
 1995 – Jerusalem Prize
 Honoris Causa Doctorate from the Hebrew University of Jerusalem
 
2011 – Honoris Causa Doctorate from the University of Tokyo
2011 – Honoris Causa Doctorate from the Tokyo University of Foreign Studies

 1996 – Peace Prize of the German Book Trade
 
 2012 – Carlos Fuentes International Prize for Literary Creation in the Spanish Language
 2016 – Pedro Henríquez Ureña International Prize
 
 1967 – Premio Nacional de Novela del Perú for his novel La casa verde
 Honoris Causa Doctorate from the National University of Saint Augustine
 Honoris Causa Doctorate from the University of Lima
 Medal and Honorary Diploma from the Catholic University of Santa María
2001 – Honoris Causa Doctorate from the National University of San Marcos, his alma mater.
 
1958 – Premio Leopoldo Alas for his work Los jefes
1962
Premio Biblioteca Breve for his work La ciudad y los perros

1967
Prix Formentor for his work La ciudad y los perros
Premio de la Crítica Española for his novel La casa verde
Rómulo Gallegos Prize for his novel La casa verde
1986 – Prince of Asturias Award for Literature
1993 – Planeta Prize for Death in the Andes, a thriller starring one of the characters in Who Killed Palomino Molero?
1994
Archbishop Saint Clemente Literary Prize, for his work Lituma en los Andes
Miguel de Cervantes Prize, after taking Spanish citizenship
1997 – Mariano de Cavia Prize from ABC
1999 – Menéndez Pelayo International Prize 
2009 – Premio ABC Cultural & Ámbito Cultural from ABC and El Corte Inglés
2013 – Convivencia Prize from Ceuta.
2015 – Honoris Causa Doctorate from the University of Burgos
Pluma de Oro from the Spanish Writers Club
 
 1988 – Freedoom Prize from Max Schmidheiny Foundation

1977 – "Simón Bolívar" Cathedratic Professor at Cambridge University
1988 – Honorary Fellow Queen Mary College
2004 – Independent Foreign Fiction Prize
2013 – Honoris Causa Doctorate from University of Cambridge

 1987 – Honorary Fellow   from Modern Language Association of America
 1987 – Honorary Fellow   from American Academy and Institute of Arts and Letters
 1990 – Honoris Causa Doctorate from Florida International University
 1991 – T.S. Eliot Award for Creative Writing from the Ingersoll Foundation
 1991 – Doctor in Humane Letters from Connecticut College
 1992 – Honoris Causa Doctorate from Boston University
 1993 – Honoris Causa Doctorate from Dowling College
 1994 – Honoris Causa Doctorate from Georgetown University
 1994 – Honoris Causa Doctorate from Yale College
 1999 – Honoris Causa Doctorate from Harvard University
 1999 – UCLA Medal from UCLA
 2002 – PEN/Nabokov Award for Achievement in International Literature from PEN America
 2006 – Maria Moors Cabot prize
 2008 – Medal for Distinguished Contributions to the Arts and Humanities from Pennsylvania State University
 2001 – Dr. Honoris Causa en la Universidad Nacional Pedro Ruiz Gallo
2011 – St. Louis Literary Award from the Saint Louis University Library Associates
 2012 – "10 Most Influential Ibero American Intellectuals" of the year – Foreign Policy magazine Mario Vargas Llosa Papers
 2020 – America Award in Literature

1967 – Rómulo Gallegos Prize
2008 – Honoris Causa Doctorate from the Simón Bolívar University

Invited Commencement Addresses 

 1992 – Boston University

Nobel Prize 

 2010 – Nobel Prize for Literature

Arms

Selected works

Fiction
 1959 – Los jefes (The Cubs and Other Stories, 1979)
 1963 – La ciudad y los perros (The Time of the Hero, 1966)
 1966 – La casa verde (The Green House, 1968)
 1969 – Conversación en la catedral (Conversation in the Cathedral, 1975)
 1973 – Pantaleón y las visitadoras (Captain Pantoja and the Special Service, 1978)
 1977 – La tía Julia y el escribidor (Aunt Julia and the Scriptwriter, 1982)
 1981 – La guerra del fin del mundo (The War of the End of the World, 1984)
 1984 – Historia de Mayta (The Real Life of Alejandro Mayta, 1985)
 1986 – ¿Quién mató a Palomino Molero? (Who Killed Palomino Molero?, 1987)
 1987 – El hablador (The Storyteller, 1989)
 1988 – Elogio de la madrastra (In Praise of the Stepmother, 1990)
 1993 – Lituma en los Andes (Death in the Andes, 1996)
 1997 – Los cuadernos de don Rigoberto (The Notebooks of Don Rigoberto, 1998)
 2000 – La fiesta del chivo (The Feast of the Goat, 2001)
 2003 – El paraíso en la otra esquina (The Way to Paradise, 2003)
 2006 – Travesuras de la niña mala (The Bad Girl, 2007)
 2010 – El sueño del celta (The Dream of the Celt, 2010)
 2013 – El héroe discreto (The Discreet Hero, 2015)
 2016 – Cinco esquinas (The Neighborhood, 2018)
 2019 – Tiempos Recios (Harsh Times, 2021)

Non-fiction
 1958 – Bases para una interpretación de Rubén Darío (The basis for interpretation of Ruben Dario)
 1971 – García Márquez: historia de un deicidio (García Márquez: Story of a Deicide)
 1975 – La orgía perpetua: Flaubert y "Madame Bovary" (The Perpetual Orgy)
 1983 – Contra viento y marea vol. 1 (Making Waves) – the English translation has selections from all three volumes of Contra viento y marea
 1986 – Contra viento y marea vol. 2
 1990 – Contra viento y marea vol. 3
 1990 – La verdad de las mentiras: ensayos sobre la novela moderna (A Writer's Reality)
 1993 – El pez en el agua. Memorias (A Fish in the Water)
 1995 – Hitos y Mitos Literarios (The Milestones and the Stories of Greatest Literary Works) (Illustrated by Willi Glasauer), (Círculo de Lectores)
 1996 – La utopía arcaica: José María Arguedas y las ficciones del indigenismo (Archaic utopia: José María Arguedas and the fictions of indigenismo)
 1997 – Cartas a un joven novelista (Letters to a Young Novelist)
 2000 – Nationalismus als neue Bedrohung (Nationalism as a new threat)
 2001 – El lenguaje de la pasión (The Language of Passion)
 2004 – La tentación de lo imposible (The Temptation of the Impossible)
 2007 – El Pregón de Sevilla (as Introduction for LOS TOROS)
 2008 – Wellsprings
 2009 – El viaje a la ficción: El mundo de Juan Carlos Onetti
 2011 – Touchstones: Essays on Literature, Art, and Politics
 2012 – La civilización del espectáculo
 2012 – In Praise of Reading and Fiction: The Nobel Lecture
 2014 – Mi trayectora intelectual (My Intellectual Journey)
 2015 – Notes on the Death of Culture
 2018 – Sabers and Utopias
 2018 – La llamada de la tribu (The Call of the Tribe)

Drama
 1952 – La huida del inca
 1981 – La señorita de Tacna
 1983 – Kathie y el hipopótamo
 1986 – La Chunga
 1993 – El loco de los balcones
 1996 – Ojos bonitos, cuadros feos
 2007 – Odiseo y Penélope
 2008 – Al pie del Támesis
 2010 – Las mil y una noches

Vargas Llosa's essays and journalism have been collected as Contra viento y marea, issued in three volumes (1983, 1986, and 1990). A selection has been edited by John King and translated and published as Making Waves.
 2003 – "The Language of Passion"

See also
 Latin American Boom
 Latin American Literature

References

Sources

 
 
 
 
 
 
 
 
 
 
 
 
 
 
 
 
 
 
 
  (CROLIB).
 
 
 
 
 Martí-Peña, Guadalupe."Presencia/Ausencia y Différance en Elogio de la madrastra y Los cuadernos de don Rigoberto de Mario Vargas Llosa." In Mario Vargas Llosa: Perspectivas Críticas: Ensayos Inéditos. Ed. Pol Popovic. U. Tecnológico de Monterrey Press, 2009. pp. 365–402.
 Martí-Peña, Guadalupe. "El teatro del ser: dualidad y desdoblamiento en la escenificación narrativa de Los cuadernos de don Rigoberto de Mario Vargas Llosa." Revista Canadiense de Estudios Hispánicos 28.2 (2004): 355–75.
 
 
 
 
 
 
 
 
 
 
  Trans. Natasha Wimmer.

External links

 
  at Princeton University
 
List of Works
 
 
 Featured author: Mario Vargas Llosa at The New York Times, 28 June 1998
 
 Interview transcript with Ramona Koval, ABC Radio National, Edinburgh International Book Festival, August 2003¨
 Mario Vargas Llosa and the Relationship Between Politics and Journalism , Andrew Wiles, 10 September 2010
 
 
 
 Mario Vargas Llosa's speech for the opening of the 20th international literature festival berlin.

 
1936 births
Living people
20th-century essayists
20th-century male writers
20th-century novelists
21st-century essayists
21st-century male writers
21st-century novelists
Academics of King's College London
Candidates for President of Peru
Chevaliers of the Légion d'honneur
Commandeurs of the Ordre des Arts et des Lettres
Complutense University of Madrid alumni
Critics of Marxism
El País columnists
Fellows of King's College London
Fellows of Churchill College, Cambridge
Former Roman Catholics
Grand Crosses of the Order of Christopher Columbus
Grand Crosses with Diamonds of the Order of the Sun of Peru
Jerusalem Prize recipients
Male dramatists and playwrights
Male essayists
Male journalists
Male novelists
Maria Moors Cabot Prize winners
Marquesses of Spain
Members of the Inter-American Dialogue
Members of the Royal Spanish Academy
Nobel laureates in Literature
National University of San Marcos alumni
PEN/Nabokov Award winners
People from Arequipa
People named in the Panama Papers
People named in the Pandora Papers
Peruvian agnostics
Peruvian classical liberals
Peruvian columnists
Peruvian dramatists and playwrights
Peruvian emigrants to Spain
Peruvian essayists
Peruvian journalists
Peruvian people of Spanish descent
Peruvian politicians
Peruvian Nobel laureates
Peruvian novelists
Peruvian male writers
Peruvian literary critics
Premio Cervantes winners
Prix Roger Caillois recipients
Recipients of the Austrian Cross of Honour for Science and Art, 1st class
Spanish Nobel laureates
Spanish people of Peruvian descent
Vargas Llosa family
Member of the Mont Pelerin Society